Eaton may refer to:

Buildings

Canada
 Eaton Centre, the name of various shopping malls in Canada due to having been anchored by an Eaton's store
 Eaton's / John Maryon Tower, a cancelled skyscraper in Toronto
 Eaton Hall (King City), a conference centre in King City, Ontario
 The Carlu, officially Eaton's 7th Floor Auditorium and Round Room, an auditorium and national historic site in Toronto
 Chelsea Hotel, Toronto, which was known as the Eaton Chelsea from 2013 to 2015
 Timothy Eaton Memorial Church, Toronto

Elsewhere
 Eaton Center (Cleveland), an office tower in Ohio, US
 Eaton Hall, Cheshire, a country home in Eccleston, England
 Lt. Warren Eaton Airport, Norwich, New York, US

Companies
 Eaton Corporation, a multinational industrial manufacturer managed from Dublin, Ireland
 Eaton's, a historic Canadian department store chain
 Bess Eaton, a New England coffee shop chain

Places

Australia

 Eaton, Northern Territory, a suburb in Darwin
Eaton, Queensland, a locality in the Cassowary Coast Region, Australia
Gunalda, a town in Gympie Region Queensland, Australia, formerly known as Eaton
 Eaton, Western Australia, a north suburb of Bunbury about 180 kilometres south of Perth

Canada
 Eatonia, Saskatchewan, formerly named Eaton
 Cookshire-Eaton, Quebec

England
 Eaton, Cheshire East, a civil parish in Cheshire
 Eaton, west Cheshire, a former civil parish in Cheshire
 Eaton, Rushton, a village near Tarporley in Cheshire
 Eaton, Leicestershire
 Eaton, Norfolk, now in the city of Norwich
 Eaton, Nottinghamshire
 Eaton, Oxfordshire, part of the civil parish of Appleton-with-Eaton, formerly in Berkshire
 Eaton railway station, a former station on the historic Bishops Castle Railway, in Shropshire
 Eaton Constantine, near The Wrekin, Shropshire
 Eaton-under-Heywood, by Wenlock Edge, Shropshire
 Long Eaton, Derbyshire
 Eaton Bray, Bedfordshire
 Eaton Socon, St Neots, Cambridgeshire
 Eaton Square, London

United States
 Eaton, Colorado
 Eaton, Indiana
 Eaton, New Hampshire
 Eaton, New York
 Eaton, Ohio
 Eaton, West Virginia
 Eaton, Wisconsin (disambiguation)
 Eaton County, Michigan
 Eaton Township, Michigan
 Eaton Township, Kearney County, Nebraska
 Eaton Township, Wyoming County, Pennsylvania
 Eaton Estates, Ohio
 Eaton Rapids, Michigan
 Eaton Rapids Township, Michigan
 Mount Eaton, Ohio
 Eaton Canyon, a major canyon beginning near San Gabriel Peak, just outside of Padsadena, California

People
 Eaton (surname)

Other uses
 USS Eaton (DD-510), a Fletcher-class destroyer of the U.S. Navy
 Eaton affair, also known as the Petticoat affair, an 1831 U.S. scandal involving members of President Andrew Jackson's Cabinet
 Eaton Collection, the largest science fiction collection
 Eaton's Corrasable Bond, a type of stationery
 Eaton's pintail (Anas eatoni), a bird
 Eaton Intermediate School District, Charlotte, Michigan, US
 Eaton's agar, a growth media used to grow Mycoplasma pneumoniae

See also
 Eton (disambiguation)
 Eaton House (disambiguation)
 Eaton School (disambiguation)
 Van Eaton